Ruairidh MacIlleathain is a Scottish Gaelic broadcaster and author with an interest in Gaelic learners. He edited the learner's newsletter Cothrom (published by Clì Gàidhlig) and hosts the radio shows Litir do Luchd-ionnsachaidh and An Litir Bheag on BBC Radio nan Gàidheal every week.

He wrote The Gaelic Place Names and Heritage of Inverness.

External links 
 An Litir Bheag BBC Alba
 Litir do Luchd-ionnsachaidh BBC Alba
 Essay by Ruairidh MacIlleathain in the Inverness Courier

Scottish Gaelic writers
Living people
Scottish Gaelic mass media
Year of birth missing (living people)